Monongahela, referred to locally as Mon City, is a third class city in Washington County, Pennsylvania, United States. The population was 4,149 at the 2020 census.

The city of Monongahela sits at a location where several locally important Pennsylvania state routes meet: a concurrency between Pennsylvania routes 88, 136, and 837 makes up most of the length of the city's Main Street, and the city's Park Avenue carries Pennsylvania route 481 to its northern terminus at Main Street.

Monongahela is one of just two cities in Washington County, and is the second smallest city in Pennsylvania (after Parker). The town is served by the Ringgold School District.

Geography and climate
Monongahela is located at  (40.200462, -79.928394).

Surrounding and adjacent neighborhoods
Monongahela has two land borders, with Carroll Township to the east and south, and New Eagle to the west. Across the Monongahela River, the Allegheny County municipality of Forward Township runs adjacent to the city.

Demographics

As of the census of 2000, there were 4,761 people, 2,139 households, and 1,264 families residing in the town. The population density was 2,472.4 people per square mile (952.5/km2). There were 2,382 housing units at an average density of 1,237.0 per square mile (476.5/km2). The racial makeup of the city was 94.94% White, 3.26% African American, 0.08% Native American, 0.19% Asian, 0.42% from other races, and 1.11% from two or more races. Hispanic or Latino of any race were 0.71% of the population.

There were 2,139 households, out of which 23.0% had children under the age of 18 living with them, 42.0% were married couples living together, 12.8% had a female householder with no husband present, and 40.9% were non-families. 36.3% of all households were made up of individuals, and 19.6% had someone living alone who was 65 years of age or older. The average household size was 2.20 and the average family size was 2.87.

In the city, the population was spread out, with 20.1% under the age of 18, 6.9% from 18 to 24, 27.4% from 25 to 44, 22.6% from 45 to 64, and 23.0% who were 65 years of age or older. The median age was 42 years. For every 100 females, there were 85.3 males. For every 100 females age 18 and over, there were 80.6 males.

The median income for a household in the city was $29,060, and the median income for a family was $36,528. Males had a median income of $31,250 versus $23,911 for females. The per capita income for the city was $16,903. About 11.1% of families and 13.6% of the population were below the poverty line, including 25.9% of those under age 18 and 7.2% of those age 65 or over.

History
What is now the City of Monongahela was founded in 1769 on a tract of land near the confluence of Pigeon Creek and the Monongahela River. It is the oldest settlement in the Monongahela River Valley and most likely the oldest in Washington County. The original tract of land was actually owned by three different men, who named their land areas Eden, Paradise, and Gloucester. Joseph Parkison, who operated a ferry on the west bank of the Monongahela River, is recognized as the founder of Monongahela. Parkison built the town's first post office, and in 1782 the town was officially recognized as Parkison's Ferry. On this tract he laid out Georgetown in 1807. Georgetown was made part of Williamsport by him on February 23, 1816. In 1833 the first borough officers were elected for Williamsport. On April 1, 1837, Williamsport was given the name Monongahela City and in 1893 shortened to Monongahela.

The word Monongahela is Native American in origin, meaning "falling banks". The Monongahela tribe was also indigenous to the area prior to the settlement of the city.

The Edward G. Acheson House, Bethel African Methodist Episcopal Church of Monongahela City, David Longwell House, and Monongahela Cemetery are listed on the National Register of Historic Places.

Places of interest
Monongahela is home to several parks, playgrounds and a museum. Chess Park, located near the center of the city, hosts community events throughout the year. The Mounds Park, built on the site of an ancient Indian Burial Ground, is a local playground and sports complex. On the banks of the Monongahela River is the Aquatorium, a waterfront venue that hosts the annual Fourth of July celebration and an annual summer concert series. The Monongahela Area Historical Society Museum located on Main Street serves as a community archive and has local historical artifacts on display.

Whiskey Point, a bluff overlooking the Monongahela River located within the city, was an important meeting place during the Whiskey Rebellion. The Pennsylvania State Historical Marker located here reads: "The bluff at Main St. and Park Ave. was the site on Aug. 14, 1794, of a meeting of 226 whiskey rebels. Albert Gallatin's eloquence turned the tide, resulting in peaceful ending of the Whiskey Rebellion and the possibility of civil strife."

Many buildings in Monongahela, such as the Longwell House and the Bethel A.M.E Church, were used by freed slaves as stops on the Underground Railroad.

There are twenty churches representing fifteen denominations located in Monongahela.

Park Avenue
A remarkable number of notable persons have lived on Park Avenue, a  stretch of road in Monongahela.

Probably the most well-known person who grew up on Park Avenue is NFL Hall of Fame quarterback Joe Montana. Other notable residents have included Carl E. Vuono, four-star general and Chief of Staff of the U.S. Army; Jim Jimirro, founder of the Disney Channel; Fred Cox, all-time leading scorer for the Minnesota Vikings and inventor of the Nerf ball; Dr. Ronald V. Pellegrini, a world-renowned cardiothoracic surgeon based in Pittsburgh; National Book Award winner, Dierdre Bair; and former Pittsburgh Pirate pitcher, Ron Necciai, who is the only professional baseball player to strike out 27 batters in one game. 

A 90-minute documentary about Park Avenue's notable residents, titled "One Extraordinary Street" was produced by Laura M. Magone and released in 2008. Magone, a graduate of Duquesne University and a Monongahela native, spent several years interviewing persons who lived on Park Avenue in an attempt to determine if there was a common thread that may have contributed to their many successes. The film also includes cameo appearances by Stan Musial and retired four-star general Colin Powell.

Government
As of February 2020, the current mayor of Monongahela is Greg Garry.

Notable people

Edward Goodrich Acheson, chemist, inventor of Carborundum
Jay Chattaway, composer for Star Trek
Fred Cox, former NFL kicker
Mitch Daniels, former Governor of Indiana (2005-2013), and former Director of the U.S. Office of Management and Budget (2001–2003)
Ame Deal, 10-year-old girl who was tortured and murdered by her family
John Taylor Gatto, educator and writer
Roland Kibbee, screenwriter and producer
Joe Montana, former NFL quarterback
Eugenie Maria Morenus, mathematician, graduated from Monongahela High School in 1898
Jackie Ormes, American cartoonist
Anthony Peterson, former NFL linebacker
Jim Renacci, Former US Congressman
Carl E. Vuono, U.S. Army general
Scott Zolak, former NFL quarterback

References

External links

City website
Monongahela Historical Society

 
Cities in Pennsylvania
Cities in Washington County, Pennsylvania
Populated places established in 1769
Pittsburgh metropolitan area
Pennsylvania populated places on the Monongahela River
Populated places on the Underground Railroad
1769 establishments in Pennsylvania